Methuselah is a -year-old Great Basin bristlecone pine (Pinus longaeva) tree growing high in the White Mountains of Inyo County in eastern California. It is recognized as the non-clonal tree with the greatest confirmed age in the world. The tree's name refers to the biblical patriarch Methuselah, who ostensibly lived to 969 years of age, thus becoming synonymous with longevity or old age in many European languages including English.

Geography
The United States Forest Service does not disclose its exact location.

Status as oldest known tree
Methuselah was 4,789 years old when sampled in 1957 by Edmund Schulman and Tom Harlan, with an estimated germination date of 2833 BC. Since this tree ages back to this date, using tree rings, research shows precipitation patterns that date back to 1983 BC.

Dendrochronologist Matthew Salzer of the University of Arizona has been unable to reproduce Schulman's age estimate, due to a missing core. Salzer's estimate is approximately  years old.

Other bristlecones
Another bristlecone specimen, WPN-114, nicknamed "Prometheus", was more than 4,844 years old when cut down in 1964, with an estimated germination date of 2880 BC. A dendrochronology, based on these trees and other bristlecone pine samples, extends back to about 9000 BC, albeit with a single gap of about 500 years.

An older bristlecone pine was reportedly discovered by Tom Harlan in 2009, based on a sample core collected in 1957. According to Harlan, the tree was 5,062 years old and still living in 2010. Neither the tree nor the sample core could be located after Harlan's death in 2013.

Clonal organisms
Other, longer-lived organisms are clonal colonies, such as a quaking aspen (Populus tremuloides) colony named "Pando" in the Fish Lake National Forest in south-central Utah that has been estimated to be 80,000 years old, although precise estimates of clonal organisms such as this aspen colony are impossible with current technologies, and other scientific attempts to age Pando have estimated it may be much younger; the 11,700-year-old creosote bush (Larrea tridentata) colony, named "King Clone", in the Mojave Desert near the Lucerne Valley in California; and the 9,500-year-old Norway spruce (Picea abies) colony named "Old Tjikko" in Sweden. Methuselah, however, is the oldest known non-clonal organism for which a reliable age has been established, although the Alerce Milenario o Gran Abuelo in Chile (5,484 – years old) ,Llangernyw Yew in Wales (4,000 – 5,000 years old) and especially the Fortingall Yew in Scotland (3,000 – 9,000 years old) have some age estimates exceeding that of Methuselah.

See also 
 List of individual trees
 List of oldest trees

References 

Individual pine trees
Individual trees in California
Inyo National Forest
White Mountains (California)
Natural history of Inyo County, California
History of California
Landmarks in California
Pinus longaeva, Methuselah
Oldest trees